Izium or Izyum is a city on the Donets River in Kharkiv Oblast (province) of eastern Ukraine. It serves as the administrative center of Izium Raion (district). Izium hosts the administration of Izium urban hromada, one of the hromadas of Ukraine. Izium had a population of

History

In 1681, a Cossack fortress was built within a small settlement, which marks the foundation date of Izium. It grew to be an important defense against Tatar invasions of the region. In 1684 the five-domed Baroque cathedral of the Saviour's Transfiguration was built. The cathedral was renovated in 1902 and restored in 1955.

In 1765, Izium became a city, and in 1780 became an administrative center of Izyumsky Uyezd, one of the subdivisions of the Kharkov Governorate of the Russian Empire.

The churches of Ascension (1819–21) and of St. Nicholas (1809–23) rank among the finest Neoclassical buildings in the region. In the second half of the 19th century, the city's main exports were wool, sold to Kharkiv and Poltava, and building materials sold to Taganrog.

During World War II, Izium was the site of numerous important battles. A Red Army salient was cut off by counterattacking German forces (during the Second Battle of Kharkiv) and was eliminated in one of the most expensive learning errors for the Red Army. Izium was occupied by the German Army from 24 June 1942 until it was liberated on 5 February 1943. The Germans operated a Nazi prison in the city.

Izium expanded rapidly in the 20th century due to its importance as a junction between Kharkiv and the Donets Basin. In January 1989 the population was 64,334 people, up from 12,000 in 1926.

In January 2013, its population was 51,511 people.

To comply with decommunization laws, the local "Lenin Square" was renamed "John Lennon Square" in February 2016.

Until 18 July 2020, Izium was incorporated as a city of oblast significance and served as the administrative center of Izium Raion, though it did not belong to the raion. In July 2020, the city of Izium was merged into Izium Raion, as part of the administrative reform of Ukraine, which reduced the number of raions of Kharkiv Oblast to seven.

Izium was the site of sporadic fighting during the Russian-Ukrainian conflict in 2014. The Sloviansk-Izium highway was referred to as the "highway of death" by locals during the summer of 2014. Large-scale fighting halted once Ukrainian forces liberated Sloviansk. 

In May 2022, Russian forces attempted to cross the Siverskyi Donets River and advance south. Ukrainian forces rebuffed the attempted river crossing with substantial Russian losses. However, after the Battle of Izium Russia gained control of the city.

Ukraine began a counteroffensive in the Kharkiv region in early September 2022, during which Izium was liberated. After liberation from the Russian invaders, local police officers found a mass grave of 440 bodies. More than 80% of the town infrastructure is destroyed; about 70% of multi-storey buildings are destroyed. The town administration estimates that all in all, about 1,000 people lost their lives under the Russian occupation.

Geography

Climate
The Köppen climate classification subtype for this climate is "Dfb", warm summer continental climate.

Gallery

See also
Second Battle of Kharkov

References

External links

 / History of the city 
 Encyclopædia Britannica Online

1681 establishments in Ukraine
Cities in Kharkiv Oblast
Izyumsky Uyezd
Donets
Cities of regional significance in Ukraine
Cities and towns built in the Sloboda Ukraine
Populated places established in 1681